The 50th Army was a military formation of the People's Liberation Army. Initially it was mostly composed of Chinese Nationalist soldiers surrendered to the Communist side during the Chinese Civil War.

During the Korean War, it was part of the People's Volunteer Army (Chinese People's Volunteers (CPV)) XIII Army Group.  It was composed of the 148th, 149th, and 150th Divisions.

The 50th Army had a unique history amongst PLA armies. It was the former Kuomintang (KMT) 60th Army uprising from Changchun City of Jilin Province on Oct. 17, 1948.  It had a long history and it could dated back to nineteenth Century during Qing Dynasty.  During the anti-Japanese War of the Second World War, it had several serious battles against main Japanese armies in Taierzhuang Village and Burma.  On April 19, 1938, the 60th Army reached the south of Shandong Province and attended the Xuzhou Battle against Japan.

During Taierzhuang Village Battle, it resisted the serious attacks from main Japanese forces for 20 days and made several losses for Japanese Invading forces.  Lu Han was the Army commander during the time of the World War Two.  In the autumn of 1943, the 60th Army went to Indochina peninsular to attack Japanese forces and also hindered the advance of the Japanese forces.  After the uprising from Changchun City of Jilin Province on Oct. 17, 1948, the 60th Army of KMT had been formed into the 50th Army of the Chinese Communist Party on Jan. 2, 1949. The 50th Army Commander was Zhen Zhesheng and the Political Commissar was Xu Wenlie.

After the 50th Army formation, the whole army was completely controlled by the Communists with the several kinds of political regulations such as the System of the Political Commissars and the System of Political Works. Another more than 5400 people from countrysides joined the Army.  The whole army transformed from the old type army into the new one.  Its fighting abilities had been reinforced greatly.

On June 14, 1949, the new 50th Army of CCF advanced towards the southeastern part of China and smashed several Kuomintang Army forces.  During Chengdu Battle it captured 8100 soldiers of Kuomintang army and forced the surrender of 17,700 KMT soldiers with a large quantity of ammunition.  In February 1950, it went to Sha city of Hubei Province to attend the farm production and build the dams of Han River. Another 27,000 KMT army forces joined the 50th army.

On October 25, 1950, the 50th Army entered Korea as part of the Chinese People's Volunteers. The 50th Army deployed southward on the CCF west flank and remained in reserve during the CCF First Phase Offensive. It was responsible for the destruction of British 1st Battalion, Royal Ulster Rifles during the Third Battle of Seoul.

The army took part in the first, second and third campaign and completely annihilated the Heavy Tank Battalion of the British 29th Brigade and became the first fighting force to enter Seoul.  During the Fourth Campaign of Korean War, the whole army persisted on the battlefields along the Han River near Seoul for 50 days and made a lot of losses on the United Nations.

The army's complete destruction during Operation Thunderbolt in February 1951 sparked controversies over the treatment of Nationalist POWs impressed into Communist service. Returned to Manchuria in March 1951 (from 15 March 1951?) for rest and refit.

In July, 1951, it entered Korea again and was commanded to defend west coasts of Korea and build the airfields under the bombing of the U. S air forces.  Between October and November 1951, it occupied several islands which were garrisoned by the South Korean Army.  On April, 1955, the 50th Army of CCF completely withdrew from Korean to China border city Dandong.

In 1967, the 50th Army went to Sichuan Province for garrison according to the order of Mao Zhedong and Lin Biao. At the end of 1969, 149th Division went to Tibet for garrison and exchanged the title as the 52nd Division. The old 52nd Division became the new 149th Division. The old 149th Division become the 52nd Mountain Brigade. The 148th and 150th Divisions fought In the east frontier line unsatisfactorily with a whole company annihilated by two Vietnam Divisions. The 149th Division followed the 13th Army to have battles in the west frontier excellently.

In 1985 the 50th Army was disbanded but the new 149th Division joined the 13th Army.

Notes

References 

Field armies of the People's Liberation Army
Military units and formations of China in the Korean War
Armies0050China
Military units and formations established in 1949
Military units and formations disestablished in 1985